Raphaëlle Grenier (born 1 August 1996) is a French ice hockey player and member of the French national team, currently playing in the Finnish Naisten Liiga (NSML) with TPS Naiset.

She represented France at the 2019 IIHF Women's World Championship.

References

External links

1996 births
Living people
French expatriate ice hockey people
French expatriate sportspeople in Finland
French women's ice hockey defencemen
Sportspeople from Orléans
TPS Naiset players